Flinders Ports Pty Limited is a company incorporated in 2001 that manages seven of South Australia's ten ports fronting the Great Australian Bight, Spencer Gulf and Gulf St Vincent. It is the state's largest port operator, employing more than 800 people . In 2007, it became part of the Flinders Port Holdings group. It is ISO-certified in safety, environmental and quality management systems.

Facilities and services 
In 2001, the company acquired seven ports that were privatised by the South Australian Government and acquired a 99-year land lease and port operating licence for the ports of Port Adelaide, Port Lincoln, Port Pirie, Thevenard, Port Giles, Wallaroo and Klein Point. At Port Adelaide, the main maritime gateway for South Australia, inbound and outbound cargoes include grains and seeds, limestone, petroleum products, motor vehicles, metals and scrap metal, cement and cement clinker, fertilisers, agricultural commodities, iron ore, iron and steel, break-bulk and general cargo, mineral sands, and mineral concentrates.

Development 
The expansion of South Australia's mining sector resulted in further development of Flinders Ports infrastructure. In 2009, the company established a dedicated bulk minerals export precinct at Berth 29, Port Adelaide, catering for exports of mineral sands, zinc concentrates, copper concentrates, sulphur and fertilisers/phosphate rock. In 2012, OZ Minerals, owners of the Prominent Hill Mine, and Flinders Logistics developed a more efficient transport system from mine to ship to reduce double handling of copper concentrates, bypass a concentrates shed and traditional loading facilities, and achieve high environmental standards, especially through minimising potential dust emissions. The first time the container is opened is when it is inverted in the hold. Suppression of dust is secured by a mist spray system designed for the specific particle sizes of the concentrate.

Sponsorship 
As part of the Flinders Port Holdings' community sponsorship program, Flinders Ports funds a number of sponsorships and provides support for many local sporting clubs, organisations and events in and around its ports. Flinders Ports has sponsored the Environment Award in the Channel 9 Young Achievers Awards since 2011 and sponsors the South Australian Maritime Museum's exhibition program.

Notes

References

External links 
 Flinders Ports
 Spencer Gulf Port Link

Companies based in Adelaide
Port authorities in Australia